The 2014 Ginetta Junior Championship was a multi-event, one make motor racing championship held across England and Scotland. The championship featured a mix of professional motor racing teams and privately funded drivers, aged between 14 and 17, competing in Ginetta G40s that conformed to the technical regulations for the championship. It formed part of the extensive program of support categories built up around the British Touring Car Championship centrepiece. It was the eighth Ginetta Junior Championship, commencing on 30 March 2014 at Brands Hatch – on the circuit's Indy configuration – and concluded on 12 October 2014 at the same venue, utilising the Grand Prix circuit, after twenty races held at ten meetings, all in support of the 2014 British Touring Car Championship season.

Jack Mitchell claimed the championship title for JHR Developments, finishing 57 points clear of HHC Motorsport driver James Kellett, with Kellett's team-mate Lando Norris finishing a further 24 points behind, in third place. Mitchell had started the season strongly, winning the first four races and ultimately, six of the first eight races. He added one further victory during the season, at Silverstone, but his consistent finishing – top-seven finishes in all bar one race from the fifth meeting onwards – allowed him to clinch the title. Kellett and Norris finished the season with the form, as the HHC pair won 9 of the last 12 races of the season. Kellett won races at five successive meetings, while Norris took nine top-two finishes. Norris outscored Kellett by 464 to 459 on total points, however, Kellett had fewer points to drop than Norris and coupled with the latter's 21 penalty points, it was Kellett that finished runner-up. The only other drivers to win races were Dan Zelos of JHR Developments and TCR driver Jamie Caroline, who each won two races; Zelos finished fourth in the championship, while Caroline finished down in sixth place. JHR Developments also won the teams' championship, finishing 66 points clear of HHC Motorsport.

Teams and drivers

Race calendar and results

Championship standings

Drivers' championship
A driver's best 18 scores counted towards the championship, with any other points being discarded.

References

External links
 

Ginetta Junior Championship season
Ginetta Junior Championship seasons